Richard Birchall (born 1887) was an English professional footballer who played as an outside left.

Career
Born in Prescot, Birchall played for Newton-le-Willows, St Helens Town, Bradford City, Carlisle United, Hyde, Norwich City, Rochdale, Lincoln City, Worksop Town, Rotherham Town and Mexborough Town.

For Bradford City, he made 1 appearance in the Football League. He made a total of 8 appearances in the Football League for Bradford City and Lincoln City.

Sources

References

1887 births
Year of death missing
English footballers
St Helens Town A.F.C. players
Bradford City A.F.C. players
Carlisle United F.C. players
Norwich City F.C. players
Rochdale A.F.C. players
Lincoln City F.C. players
Hyde United F.C. players
Worksop Town F.C. players
Rotherham Town F.C. (1899) players
Mexborough Town F.C. players
English Football League players
Association football outside forwards